Edit Balázsovits (born 13 June 1975 in Budapest) is a Jászai Mari-Award winning Hungarian actress, singer. She starred in numerous plays, TV dramas and films, as well as many major international productions. In 2008, she was presented the Kornay Mariann-Award.

Early life

Childhood and parental influence
Born to an actor family in 1975, with father Lajos Balazsovits (Nagykanizsa, 4 December 1946–), Balázs Béla-Award-winning Hungarian actor, theatre director and theatre manager, meritorious artist. Her mother is Éva Almási (Budapest, 5 June 1942–) Kossuth- and Jászai Mari-Award-winning actress, meritorious and honorary artist.

Education and career
Edit Balázsovits graduated from Városmajor Secondary Grammar School in 1993, then went on to earn her degree at the University of Theatre and Film Arts (1997), after which she had been a member of the Comedy Theatre of Budapest. Her first leading role was as an actress at the Comedy Theatre of Budapest in the fourth year of her university studies, she played the role of Natasa Rosztova in Tolstoy's War and Peace. After 2001, she became a freelance artist. She often worked together with her mother and father. In Popfestival 40, the 40th anniversary production of An Imaginary Report on an American Rock Festival (Comedy Theatre of Budapest, 2013) she played the same role as her mother did before her.

Her first television role was as a child in an episode of The Family Circle television series. Thanks to her fluency in English, she acted in many foreign television dramas and films shot in Hungary (A Good Day to Die Hard, 2013; Borgias, 2013; Silent Witness, 1996 – BBC series). She is also known as a dubbing actress, doing voice-over for many successful films. 
In 2008, she was awarded the Kornay Mariann Artistic Award for playing the role of Victoria in the musical comedy of Home and Beauty. Her life's work is acknowledged by her trade, in 2009, she won a Jászai Mari-Award.
Music has always been an important part of her life, in 2009 she produced a special album entitled New Republic songs, where she sang songs written especially for her by the band Republic. After the release of the album, she toured for nearly a year with the band.

Private life
She married Dr József Fürstner in 2004. Her son Richard was born in 2005.

Awards
Kornay Mariann-Award (2008)
Jászai Mari-Award (2009)

Major theatre roles
Alexander Breffort – Marguerite Monnot: Irma La Douce (IRMA) – Pince Theatre, 2013 dir.: Daniel Dicső
Ferenc Molnár: The Devil (ELZA TÓTH) – Karinthy Theatre, 2013 dir.: Tamás Balikó
Popfestival 40 (ESZTER) – Comedy Theatre of Budapest, 2013 dir.: Enikő Eszenyi
Sandor Hunyadi: Lovagias ügy (BABA) – Karinthy Theatre, 2012 dir.: István Verebes
Ferenc Herczeg: The Blue Fox (CECIL) – Játékszín, 2012 dir.: Lajos Balázsovits
Carlo Collodi: Pinocchio (THE FAIRY WITH TURQUOISE HAIR)  – Madách Theatre, 2011 dir.: Kati Pesty-Nagy
Robert Harling: Steel Magnolias (SHELBY) – Játékszín, 2013  dir.: György Korcsmáros
Molière: George Dandin, or the Confounded Husband (CLAUDINE), Játékszín 2008 dir.: Péter Telihay
William Somerset Maugham: Home and Beauty (VICTORIA), Játékszín 2008 dir.: Lajos Balázsovits
Neil Simon:  Barefoot in the Park (CORIE BRATTER), Játékszín 2007 dir.: Lajos Balázsovits
Doris Dörrie: Happy (EMILIA), Játékszín 2004 dir.: Lajos Balázsovits
János Ács: Casanova Nuova (YOUNG ACTRESS), Jozsef Katona Theatre Kecskemet 2004 dir.: János Ács
Gábor Vaszary-Szabolcs Fényes-Istvan Szenes: Bubus (KLÁRIKA), Játékszín 2004 dir.: Lajos Balázsovits
Publius Ovidius Naso: Children of Gods (Scenes from Metamorphoses), Comedy Theatre of Budapest 2003 dir.: Géza D. Hegedűs
John Osborne: Angry Young Men (ALISON), Thália Theatre 2003 dir.: Éva Almási
Cander-Ebb: Cabaret (SALLY BOWLES), Budapest Operetta and Musical Theatre 2002 dir.: Róbert Alföldi
Mark Ravenhill: Shopping and Fucking (LULU), Thália Theatre 2002 dir.: Róbert Alföldi
Ronald Harwood: The Dresser (IRENE), Játékszín 2002 dir.: Lajos Balázsovits
Dostoevsky: Crime and Punishment (DUNYA), Comedy Theatre of Budapest 2001 dir.: Géza Tordy
Shakespeare: Love's Labour's Lost (MARIA), Comedy Theatre of Budapest 2000 dir.: László Keszég
Caryl Churghill: The Skriker (JOSIE), Comedy Theatre of Budapest 2000 dir.: Sándor Zsótér
Daphne du Maurier: Rebecca (MRS. DE WINTER), Játékszín 1999 dir.: Károly Makk
Dostoevsky: The Brothers Karamazov (KATERINA), Comedy Theatre of Budapest 1999 dir.: János Szikora
Shakespeare: The Tempest (MIRANDA), Comedy Theatre of Budapest 1999 dir.: Róbert Alföldi
Ben Elton: Popcorn (VELVET), Comedy Theatre of Budapest 1998 dir.: László Marton
Carlo Collodi: Pinocchio (THE FAIRY WITH TURQUOISE HAIR), Hungarian Theatre of Pest 1998 dir.: Balázs Simon
Kern-Presser: 14 St Steven Boulevard, Comedy Theatre of Budapest 1998 dir.: László Marton
Arthur Miller: The Crucible (SUSANNA WALCOTT), Comedy Theatre of Budapest 1998 dir.: Péter Rudolf
Trembalay: The Sisters-in-law (LINDA LAUZON), Hungarian Theatre of Pest 1997 dir.: Géza D. Hegedűs
Euripides: The Pheadra-story (ARICIA), Comedy Theatre of Budapest 1997 dir.: Róbert Alföldi
Mrozek: Tango (ALA), Hungarian Theatre of Pest 1997 dir.: Géza D. Hegedűs
Ede Szigligeti: Young Lilly (MARISKA), Castle Theatre of Gyula 1997 dir.: Tamás Balikó
Endre Fejes: Good night summer, good night love (HŰVÖSNÉ KRISZ), Ódry Stage 1997 dir.: Imre Csiszár
Friedrich Schiller: The Robbers (AMALIA), Ódry Stage1996 dir.: Géza D. Hegedűs
Kipling-László Dés- Pál Békés: The Book of the Jungle, 1996, Hungarian Theatre of Pest dir.: Géza D. Hegedűs
Tolstoy-Piscator: War and Peace (NATASA ROSTOVA), Comedy Theatre of Budapest 1996 dir.: Péter Valló
Pál Békés: Össztánc, Comedy Theatre of Budapest 1994 dir.: László Marton

Film and television roles
A Good Day to Die Hard (2013) – supporting role
Borgias (2013) – supporting role
Casting everything (2007) dir.: Péter Tímár
One human minute (2007) dir.: Zoltán Verebes
The abduction of the sabine women – TV drama (dir: Péter Valló)
T?ICK – short film (2003) dir.: Pater Sparrow
 Az Egérút (2001) dir: Júlia Sára
"A boldogság felé indultam én..."(2002) – poetry television series
Silent Witness (1996) – English (BBC) series, 
The Sixes dir.: István Verebes– cabaret series
100 years of cabaret dir.: István Verebes– television series

Dubbing roles
The Skin Game [1931] – dir.: Alfred Hitchcock
Taras Bulba [1962] – dir.: J. Lee Thompson
To Sir, with Love [1967] – dir.: James Clavell
Curse of the Pink Panther [1983] – dir.: Blake Edwards
The Crossing Guard [1995] – dir.: Sean Penn
Les Couloirs du temps: Les visiteurs 2 [1998] – dir.: Jean-Marie Poiré
Dr T and the Women [2000] – dir.: Robert Altman
Love's Labour's Lost [2000] – dir.: Kenneth Branagh
Coyote Ugly [2000] – dir.: David McNally
Return to Me [2000] – dir.: Bonnie Hunt
Crazy/Beautiful [2001] – dir.: John Stockwell
Valentine [2001] – dir.: Jamie Blanks
Two Weeks Notice [2002] – dir.: Marc Lawrence
The Transporter [2002] – dir.: Louis Leterrier, Corey Yuen
Alien Hunter [2003] – dir.: Ron Krauss
The Bridge of San Luis Rey [2004] – dir.: Mary McGuckian

Singer
New Republic Songs (2009) CD/studio album – EMI/Capitol
An Imaginary Report on an American Rock Festival (1998) CD/cover album – BMG Ariola /Vinnélek, vinnélek... – Edit Balázsovits, Péter Novák

References

External links
http://www.imdb.com/name/nm1492076/
https://web.archive.org/web/20120601212253/http://fidelio.hu/fidipedia/szinhaz/szinhazi_szemelyek/balazsovits_edit
http://www.femina.hu/hazai_sztar/sztarlexikon/balazsovits_edit
https://web.archive.org/web/20141007195136/http://www.port.hu/balazsovits_edit/pls/w/person.person?i_pers_id=28031
https://web.archive.org/web/20141023183219/http://www.magyarszinkron.hu/?module=movies&action=showperson&mpid=5428&category=szineszno
https://web.archive.org/web/20141023170008/http://www.life.hu/bulvar/20130311-a-republic-egyuttes-elhunyt-enekesere-bodi-laszlo-cipore-emlekeznek-hazai.html
https://web.archive.org/web/20141205110335/http://szinhaz.hu/szinhazi-hirek/55054-most-nagyon-jo-balazsovits-edit-a-vigben-jatszik
https://web.archive.org/web/20141205111126/http://szinhaz.hu/szinhazi-hirek/53550-ez-most-a-sumakolas-vilaga-almasi-eva-es-balazsovits-edit-valaszolt
https://web.archive.org/web/20141023164210/http://www.storyonline.hu/hirek/balazsovits_edit_ujra_dolgozik_de/2483/
https://web.archive.org/web/20141023171116/http://www.bedit.eoldal.hu/
https://web.archive.org/web/20141101203335/http://musicalinfo.jegy.hu/info.php?actor=1029

1975 births
Living people
Hungarian film actresses